Paul Rafaelovich Amnuél (born 20 February 1944) is a Soviet and Israeli physicist and science fiction writer. He was born in Baku, Azerbaijan. He attended Azerbaijan State University and worked at Shamakhi Astrophysical Observatory for 23 years.

References

Members of the Eurasian Astronomical Society
1944 births
Baku State University alumni
Israeli science fiction writers
Scientists from Baku
Living people
Azerbaijani emigrants to Israel